is a Japanese boxer. He competed at the 1984 Summer Olympics and the 1988 Summer Olympics.

References

External links
 

1963 births
Living people
Japanese male boxers
Olympic boxers of Japan
Boxers at the 1984 Summer Olympics
Boxers at the 1988 Summer Olympics
Sportspeople from Tokyo
Featherweight boxers
20th-century Japanese people
21st-century Japanese people